Dawkinsia exclamatio is a species of cyprinid fish found in Kallada River, Kerala, India where it occurs in areas with clear water with pebble and rock substrates. This species can reach a length of  SL.

References 

Dawkinsia
Endemic fauna of India
Freshwater fish of India
Taxa named by Rohan Pethiyagoda
Taxa named by Maurice Kottelat
Fish described in 2005